The Liga Națională de Rugby is a semi-professional rugby union club competition that is played in Romania.

History
The first Romanian competition took place in 1914 between two Bucharest team's in Tennis Club Român and Sporting Club with Tennis Club Român taking out the first title winning both of the matches by eight and three points respectively. The competition expanded and grew in the 1920s and 1930s (with a peak in the 1970s and 1980s), after Stadiul Român and seventeen more (other) teams were founded in Bucharest-only ever since. The championship took place on an annual basis, with some gap years caused by the two World Wars mostly.

The first team set up outside Bucharest (to play the top tier competition) was IAR Brașov in 1939, a team owned and run by the famous Braşov aircraft factory I.A.R. (Industria Aeronautică Română), but the first one to become champion of Romania was Universitatea Timișoara, only in 1972.

The European Champions Cup in its early years (1960s) used to be a Franco-Romanian affair, with RC Grivița București (1964) and Dinamo (1967) grabbing their fair share of glory. In 1995 it was Farul Constanţa the team to represent Romania in the newly born Heineken Cup (splitting with Stade Toulousain the honour of playing on home ground the first ever match of the competition), but that was to be followed by no other participation of a Romanian side ever since (as of 2020). Nonetheless the Romanian teams turned to the European Challenge Cup although never actually advanced to the quarterfinals. To better cope with the strong clubs of the 6 Nations countries the Romanian Rugby Union pulled together an all-domestic franchise - Stejarii (The Oaks), to be later renamed Lupii București (Bucharest Wolves) - but despite the healthy idea and some gleams of success, the mighty SuperLiga clubs forced the Romanian Rugby Establishment to back off and allow again the champions of the SuperLiga to take part in the European Challenge Cup.

Current teams

Note: Flags indicate national union as has been defined under WR eligibility rules. Players may hold more than one non-WR nationality

Champions

Winners by year

See also
 Cupa României 
 Rugby union in Romania

References

External links
 rugbyromania.ro – Official Website 
 rugby.ro - Romanian Rugby History 

Sports leagues established in 1914
1914 establishments in Romania
Rugby union leagues in Romania
Rugby union leagues in Europe
National rugby union premier leagues
Rugby union